Faklen was a Danish language intellectual magazine, debating humanism, contemporary Danish politics, education, and philosophical themes. The magazine was based in Copenhagen, Denmark.

History
The magazine was founded in 1996 by editor-in-chief Rune Engelbreth Larsen and a group of students from Danish universities in close cooperation with Danish author and philosopher Erwin Neutzsky-Wulff. Neutzsky-Wulff provided much of the material from the founding until his break with the magazine in 1999. the magazine was published by the students of the universities of Aarhus and Copenhagen. It covered news on cultural trends and social comment in Denmark. The topics emphasized included discrimination, racism, civil rights, forced labour, arbitrary solitary confinement and religious freedom.

From 1996 to 2001 Faklen was a print magazine. In 2002 it became an online-only magazine, a format it continued with until 2011 when the magazine was discontinued.

See also
 List of magazines in Denmark

References

External links

Danish
Faklen's home page
Neutzsky-Wulff's home page 
Eskapisme - Fanpage, referring most of Neutzsky-Wulffs production.
Neutzsky-Wulffs historier - Background and analysis.

English
''Faklen'''s section in English
English texts by Erwin Neutzsky-Wulff 

1996 establishments in Denmark
2011 disestablishments in Denmark
Danish-language magazines
Defunct magazines published in Denmark
Defunct political magazines
Magazines established in 1996
Magazines disestablished in 2011
Magazines published in Copenhagen
Political magazines published in Denmark